The 1970 Pacific Tigers football team represented the University of the Pacific (UOP) in the 1970 NCAA University Division football season as a member of the Pacific Coast Athletic Association.

Led by first-year head coach Homer Smith, the Tigers played home games at Pacific Memorial Stadium in Stockton, California. They opened with three wins, finished at 5–6 (2–3 PCAA, tied for fourth), and were outscored 231 to 166.

Schedule

NFL Draft
One UOP Tiger was selected in the 1971 NFL Draft.

Notes

References

Pacific
Pacific Tigers football seasons
Pacific Tigers football